A Man Rides Through is a novel by Stephen R. Donaldson published in 1987.

Plot summary
A Man Rides Through is a novel in which allegiances shift as enemies become allies.

Reception
Dave Langford reviewed A Man Rides Through for White Dwarf #100, and stated that "Donaldson could usefully have boiled out lots of repetition, especially when in Significant Italics, and his efforts to end passages with striking sentences can be clumsy or laughable ('He felt like crowing.'), but after all my brickbats he deserves a pat on the head. This author is genuinely improving."

Reviews
Review by Faren Miller (1987) in Locus, #320 September 1987
Review by Don D'Ammassa (1987) in Science Fiction Chronicle, #99 December 1987
Review by Chris Barker (1988) in Vector 143

References

1987 American novels
American fantasy novels
Del Rey books
Novels by Stephen R. Donaldson